The ring ouzel (Turdus torquatus) is a mainly European member of the thrush family Turdidae. It is a medium-sized thrush,  in length and weighing . The male is predominantly black with a conspicuous white crescent across its breast. Females are browner and duller than males, and young birds may lack the pale chest markings altogether. In all but the northernmost part of its range, this is a high-altitude species, with three races breeding in mountains from Ireland east to Iran. It breeds in open mountain areas with some trees or shrubs, the latter often including heather, conifers, beech, hairy alpenrose or juniper. It is a migratory bird, leaving the breeding areas to winter in southern Europe, North Africa and Turkey, typically in mountains with juniper bushes. The typical clutch is 3–6 brown-flecked pale blue or greenish-blue eggs. They are incubated almost entirely by the female, with hatching normally occurring after 13 days. The altricial, downy chicks fledge in another 14 days and are dependent on their parents for about 12 days after fledging.

The ring ouzel is omnivorous, eating invertebrates, particularly insects and earthworms, some small vertebrates, and a wide range of fruit. Most animal prey is caught on the ground. During spring migration and the breeding season, invertebrates dominate the adult's diet and are also fed to the chicks. Later in the year, fruit becomes more important, particularly the common juniper.

With an extensive range and a large population, the ring ouzel is evaluated as least concern by the International Union for Conservation of Nature (IUCN). There are signs of decline in several countries; suspected causes including climate change, human disturbance, hunting and outdoor leisure activities. Loss of junipers may also be a factor in some areas. Natural hazards include predation by mammalian carnivores and birds of prey, and locally there may also be competition from other large thrushes such as the common blackbird, mistle thrush and fieldfare.

Etymology
"Ouzel" is an old name for the common blackbird, the word being cognate with the German . "Ouzel" may also be applied to a group of superficially similar but more distantly related birds, the dippers, the European representative of which is sometimes known as the water ouzel. "Ring Ouzel" was first used by John Ray in his 1674 Collection of English Words not Generally Used and became established with his 1678 book The Ornithology of Francis Willughby of Middleton in the County of Warwick. Old and local names for the ring ouzel include "fell blackbird", "hill blackbird", "moor blackbird", "rock ouzel" and "mountain blackbird".

Taxonomy

The ring ouzel was first described by Carl Linnaeus under its current scientific name in his 1758 10th edition of Systema Naturae. He noted earlier descriptions by Francis Willughby and Eleazar Albin, both of whom gave it the name Merula torquata.

There are  about 85 species of medium to large thrushes in the genus Turdus. They are characterised by rounded heads, medium or longish pointed wings, and usually melodious songs.

A 2020 study of the genetics of Turdus suggested that the genus arose about 9.37 million years ago (Mya), expanding out of Africa around 7.2 Mya, and diverging into Palearctic and Oriental groups about 5.7 Mya. Further radiation from Africa to the Americas followed at about 5.3 Mya. Details of the study suggest that the ring ouzel, a member of the Eurasian group, may be more closely related to Naumann's and dusky thrushes than to the superficially more similar common blackbird.

Subspecies

The ring ouzel has three recognised subspecies: The northern ring ouzel, Turdus torquatus torquatus Linnaeus (1758) is the nominate subspecies (the subspecies that repeats the name of the species). It breeds across western and northern Europe from Ireland through Scandinavia to northwest Russia and winters in southern Europe and northwest Africa. The Alpine ring ouzel, T. t. alpestris Brehm, C L (1831) breeds in mountain ranges from Iberia through southern and central Europe to the Balkans, Greece and western Turkey, and also in North Africa. It winters in North Africa, southern Europe and southern Turkey. The Caucasian ring ouzel, T. t. amicorum Hartert E (1923) breeds in central and eastern Turkey east to Turkmenistan, and winters mainly in Iran and parts of Iraq. Analysis of mitochondrial DNA samples from across Europe suggests that this species had a much broader distribution after the Last Glacial Period that ended about 11,700 years ago than it does now.

Description
The plumage of the male of the nominate race is entirely black except for a conspicuous white crescent on the breast, narrow greyish scaling on the upperparts and belly and pale edges to the wing feathers. The bill is yellow and the legs are greyish brown. The female resembles the male but is browner and with a duller breast band. Juveniles are like the female, but with a faint or non-existent breast crescent.

The pale breast marking makes adults of this species unmistakeable; first-winter males also sometimes show a pale crescent. Other young ouzels can be confused with the common blackbird, but always show a paler wing panel than that species.

Males of T. t. alpestris have broader white scalloping (repeated small curves) on their underparts than T. t. torquatus, giving a distinctly scaly appearance below. The wing panel is also paler than in the nominate subspecies. Females are much as the nominate race, but with broad white fringes on the chin and throat. Males of T. t. amicorum have the largest and whitest breast band of the three subspecies, and the broader white edges and tips of the wing feathers form a distinctive whitish panel in the wing. Females have narrow white fringes on their underparts. Adult ring ouzels undergo a complete moult after breeding from late June to early September, before their autumn migration. Juveniles have a partial moult between July and September, replacing their head, body and wing covert feathers.

Voice
The male ring ouzel sings from a low perch or occasionally in flight. The song consists of a repetition of 2–4 plaintive fluty notes,  with pauses between repeats. The call is a loud , becoming harsher if the bird is alarmed. The contact call is a soft  in flight. Males sing most frequently at dawn and sunset.

Distribution and habitat
The ring ouzel breeds discontinuously across western and northern Europe from north-west Ireland through Scandinavia to northwest Russia, and in mountains across central southern Europe from the Pyrenees through the Alps, the Balkans, Greece and Turkey east to Turkmenistan. In 2014, breeding was recorded on the Timan Ridge, Arkhangelsk Oblast, about  further east than previously known breeding sites in north Russia.

The species is migratory, birds leaving the breeding areas in September and October. Birds of the nominate subspecies winter in southern Spain and northwest Africa. Central European populations of T. t. alpestris move to higher elevations initially before moving south or southwest through the Swiss Alps; some two weeks later migrants of the nominate form pass through the same area to winter in the south of the breeding range or around the Mediterranean. Eastern alpestris ouzels migrate through the Balkans and Turkey. T. t. amoricus moves south to Egypt and neighbouring areas. The return migration is mainly in March and April, the males arriving some days before the females. Northern breeders arrive later, and in the mountains, some birds may ascend in stages as the snow melts. Many birds stop off at traditional well-grazed grassland locations in both spring and autumn.

The ring ouzel is extinct in Latvia and occurs only on migration in Denmark. It is a passage migrant in Syria and a vagrant to Iceland, Jordan, the Arabian Peninsula, Sudan, Kazakhstan, Mauritania, Svalbard and Jan Mayen. In the Atlantic, it is a regular winter visitor to the Canary Islands but a rarity in the Azores and Madeira.

In middle latitudes, the ring ouzel is a bird of continental mountains, but in the north of its range, it is found in coastal uplands. It can cope with wind and rain but avoids ice and snow. Nominate T. t. torquatus is usually found on open moorland with a few stunted trees above , and reaching  in Scotland and northern Europe.

On migration, ouzels may occur on coastal grassland and steep hillsides with short, unsown wild grass and sparse scrub.

Behaviour
The ring ouzel is territorial and normally seen alone or in pairs, although loose flocks may form on migration. When not breeding, several birds may be loosely associated in good feeding areas, such as a fruiting tree, often with other thrushes such as song thrushes or redwings. The ouzel's flight is direct, and birds often perch on rocks or heather clumps.

Breeding

Ring ouzels nest from mid-April to mid-July in the Alps and the British Isles, and from May to August in Scandinavia. The nest, built by the female, is a cup of leaves, dry grass and other plant material consolidated with mud.

The clutch is 3–6 pale blue or greenish-blue eggs flecked with reddish-brown. Incubation is almost always by the female, hatching typically occurring after 13 days. The altricial, downy chicks fledge in another 14 days. The young are dependent on their parents for about 12 days after fledging.

Adults breed after their first year and their average lifespan is two years, although nine years has been recorded. There may be two broods, especially in the south of the range, although triple-brooding is rare. This species is philopatric, returning to the same area to breed each year. Around 36% of juveniles survive their first year, while the annual survival rate for adults is 47% for males and 37% for females. The main causes of death in northwest Europe are predation (9%), accidental human-related incidents (10%), and hunting, mainly in France (77%).

Diet

The ring ouzel is omnivorous, eating a wide range of insects, earthworms, small amphibians and reptiles and fruit. Most animal prey is caught on the ground.

During spring migration and the breeding season, invertebrates dominate the diet, and include earthworms, beetles flies, ants, spiders and snails. Later in the year, fruit becomes more important, including bramble, strawberry, cherry, hawthorn, rowan and juniper. Where it is available common juniper makes up more than 90% of the ring ouzel's winter diet, with arthropods constituting most of the rest. As a result, the ring ouzel is an important vector for dispersing the juniper's seeds, and is key to the dispersal of the endemic Canary Islands juniper.

The young are mainly fed invertebrates, caterpillars and earthworms being major items where available. Although birds migrating in autumn use similar habitat to that used in spring, seasonal berries make up most of their diet, particularly elderberries, haws and, where available, juniper berries.

Predators and parasites

Predators of the ring ouzel include the tawny owl, long-eared owl, common buzzard, common kestrel and Eurasian sparrowhawk, least weasel and stoat. Most deaths are of young juveniles, and birds hatched early in the season are more likely to survive than later broods. A Scottish study showed that raptors were responsible for 59% of deaths and mammals for 27%. In Romania, eggs were taken by red squirrels and spotted nutcrackers. As with other Turdus thrushes, the ring ouzel is rarely a host of the common cuckoo, a brood parasite. If the thrush's nest cup is too deep for the cuckoo to evict the host's chicks, the young cuckoo cannot successfully compete for food with the fast-growing host species' chicks, and if the cuckoo does manage to expel its nest-mates, the parents are reluctant to feed it; either way, the young cuckoo will starve.

A study in the Carpathian Mountains found that a significant proportion of ring ouzels carried trombiculid mites, commonly known as chiggers. These mites commonly infect ground-feeding birds, and heavy infestations can cause birds to lose condition and stop feeding. The hard-bodied tick Ixodes festai commonly parasitises thrushes, including the ring ouzel. There is a record of this species carrying a Haemoproteus  blood parasite.

Status and conservation
The species is not believed to approach the thresholds for the population decline criteria of the IUCN Red List (i.e., declining more than 30% in ten years or three generations), and is therefore evaluated as least concern. The breeding population in Europe was estimated to be 299,000–598,000 pairs in 2019.

There are signs of decline in several countries. Its  decline
in Ireland in recent  years has been striking,  with regular breeding  now confined to two counties.  Suspected causes include climate change, human disturbance, hunting and outdoor leisure activities. Loss of junipers may be a factor in southern Spain and north-west Africa, as may upland forestation in the UK. There may also be competition from larger thrushes like the common blackbird, mistle thrush and fieldfare. A Scottish study suggested that sites at higher altitudes and with a good cover of heather were less likely to have been deserted by breeding ring ouzels than lower or more open locations.

Explanatory notes

Citations

Cited texts

External links
 

 Audio recording of ring ouzel at Xeno-canto

Birds described in 1758
Birds of Europe
Taxa named by Carl Linnaeus
Turdus